Donald F. Hazelton (1928/1929 – September 14, 2012) was an American politician who served as a Democratic member for the 78th district of the Florida House of Representatives from 1970 to 1978.

Hazelton was born in Buffalo, New York, and attended Cornell University and Florida State University. He worked as a photographer. In 1970, he was elected for the 78th district of the Florida House of Representatives, succeeding William G. James. He was succeeded by Ray Liberti in 1978.

Hazelton died in September 2012 in Tallahassee, Florida, at the age of 83.

References 

1920s births
2012 deaths
Politicians from Buffalo, New York
Members of the Florida House of Representatives
Florida Democrats
Florida Republicans
20th-century American politicians
Cornell University alumni
Florida State University alumni
American photographers
20th-century American photographers